Jan Maria Plojhar is a Czech novel, written by Julius Zeyer. Written in late 1887 and early 1888, it was first published in 1891. 

It is a tragedy about a Czech poet living abroad in Greece and Italy, who is incurably ill with tuberculosis after a chest wound suffered in a duel. In an effort to find a muse, the protagonist, Jan Maria Plojhar, has affairs with three women, including a married Romanian called Mrs Dragopulos, described as a femme fatale, and a prostitute called Gemma.

Czech history is also a theme of the novel, and Plojhar is used as a symbol of the Czech state.

References

Works
 
 
 
 

1891 Czech novels